Bettina Dajka (born 2 October 1990 in Miskolc) is a retired Hungarian handballer.

Achievements
Nemzeti Bajnokság I:
Winner: 2007
Silver Medalist: 2009, 2012
Bronze Medalist: 2008, 2011
Magyar Kupa:
Silver Medalist: 2010
EHF Cup Winners' Cup:
Winner: 2011, 2012
Semifinalist: 2007
Junior European Championship:
Silver Medalist: 2009

References

External links
 Bettina Dajka player profile on Ferencvárosi TC Official Website
 Bettina Dajka career statistics at Worldhandball

1990 births
Living people
Sportspeople from Miskolc
Hungarian female handball players